Balintraid  is an industrial settlement, which was built largely in the 1970s with the growth of the North Sea oil industry in Scotland, lies on the north east corner of Nigg Bay, in the Cromarty Firth in Ross-shire, Scottish Highlands and is in the Scottish council area of Highland. Balintraid pier - probably the oldest pier on the Cromarty Firth, was built by Thomas Telford in 1824.

The village of Invergordon lies less than 1 miles to the west, with the village of Barbaraville 1 mile to the west.

References

Populated places in Ross and Cromarty